The 1931 Grinnell Pioneers football team was an American football team that represented Grinnell College during the 1931 college football season as a member of the Missouri Valley Conference. In their fifth year under head coach Lester Watts, the team compiled a 5–3 record.

Schedule

References

Grinnell
Grinnell Pioneers football seasons
Grinnell Pioneers football